Professor Victor Ngonidzashe Muzvidziwa is the current Vice Chancellor of Midlands State University in Zimbabwe. He is an anthropologist trained at the University of Waikato, New Zealand. His other qualifications, BA and MA, are from the University of Zimbabwe.

Career 
Muzvidziwa is a career academic whose journey in higher and tertiary education began in 1983 as a Teaching Assistant at the University of Zimbabwe. He subsequently chaired his department, before being promoted to be Dean of the Faculty of Social Sciences at University of Zimbabwe. He went on to hold the same position at University of Swaziland. He returned to his home country after being promoted as Pro-Vice Chancellor at University of Zimbabwe. He then moved to Midlands State University where he became an understudy of the founding vice chancellor Professor Ngwabi Bhebhe who was facing retirement.

Research 
His research encompasses a wide range of interests including: livelihood studies, gender, marriage, migration, and housing.

References 

University of Waikato alumni
University of Zimbabwe alumni
Anthropologists
Academic staff of the University of Zimbabwe
Year of birth missing (living people)
Living people
Place of birth missing (living people)
University of Eswatini
Zimbabwean people